This is a list of the largest sports contracts. These figures include signing bonuses but exclude options, buyouts, and the endorsement deals. This list does not reflect the highest annual salaries or career earnings, only the top 100 largest contracts and thus is largely limited to athletes in team sports and auto racing. Athletes in individual sports, such as golf, tennis, table tennis, boxing, kickboxing, and MMA, are not employed by a team and usually earn money primarily through event winnings. This list also does not necessarily reflect actual money collected by the athletes, since some contracts are eventually terminated (usually due to an athlete either retiring or invoking an opt-out clause).

Entries in this list also require an individual citation of the contract, so a number of the highest salaried athletes (according to Forbes) are not included as their contract details have not been officially confirmed, including the likes of Cristiano Ronaldo, Roger Federer, and Lewis Hamilton. This also skews the list towards sports with salary caps where salaries are therefore public knowledge and easy to cite.

The contract figures referenced below are presented at face value and do not reflect potential pre or post-tax treatments. For example, contracts with European sports teams are typically quoted on a post-tax basis.

Largest sports contracts

Footnotes

R – retired
Injury – While still technically under contract, injury has ended his career
* – left team (or streaming service) before expiration of contract
‡ – entirety of contract salary not guaranteed
(tie) – score of two or more above mentioned athletes heretofore considered equal if their contracts have been signed within a given timeframe providing negligible inflation ratio (during the same year)

See also
 Salary cap
 Gaius Appuleius Diocles
 List of most expensive association football transfers
 List of professional sports leagues

Notes

 Contracts in the NFL are often not guaranteed, meaning that players who retire, or who are cut, do not receive their contracted salaries after their release from the team.
 NBA and NHL seasons span two calendar years, as do seasons in all of the richest European association football leagues.
 During his contract years, Michael Schumacher had significantly higher annual earnings than the athletes on this list with larger total contracts. On top of his $31 million per year paid by the Ferrari team, which alone ranked as the highest annual earnings at the time, he also earned a significant amount more per year from race winnings.
 David Beckham signed a five-year deal with MLS soccer team Los Angeles Galaxy that was worth a reported $251 million, but that figure included commercial endorsements; only $5 million a year of that figure was salary from the club, while the rest came via existing endorsements and profit sharing with the club.
 Lewis Hamilton signed a contract with McLaren Mercedes worth at least £70 million (US$138 million) over 5 seasons (2008–2012). However, no official contract details were released by the team.

References

External links
 

Household income
Contracts
Sports business
Largest sports contracts
Sports contracts
Sports contracts